Chaim Yehuda ("Yudel") Krinsky (born December 3, 1933, in Boston, Massachusetts) is an ordained rabbi and a member of the Chabad-Lubavitch movement. He has served in various positions of the movement's administrative staff since 1954, and as a personal secretary to its chief rabbi, Menachem Mendel Schneerson (along with Yehuda Leib Groner and Binyomin Klein), And serves as chairman of the movement's main institutions.

In 1988, after the passing of his wife, Chaya Mushka Schneerson, Menachem Mendel Schneerson, the Lubavitcher Rebbe named Krinsky an executor of his will.

As of 2004, Krinsky was among the most influential figures within the Chabad movement.

Biography
Krinsky grew up in Dorchester, Massachusetts and was educated at the Boston Latin School. At the age of 12, he was sent by his parents to study at the Central Lubavitch Yeshiva in Brooklyn, where he received his rabbinic ordination. He joined the Lubavitcher Rebbe's staff in 1952 as a driver.

Activities
In 1956 Krinsky was invited by Rabbi Schneerson to join his secretariat, then headed by Rabbi Mordechai Aizik Hodakov. Krinsky's position included work on behalf of the Merkos L'Inyonei Chinuch, the educational arm of the Chabad-Lubavitch movement. At that time, Schneerson also appointed Krinsky to direct the Lubavitch News Service. In this capacity, he was in charge of disseminating the Rebbe's talks around the world via satellite.

In 1972, Rabbi Shneerson appointed Krinsky to serve on the administrative boards of the movement's umbrella organization, Agudas Chasidei Chabad, and it's educational arm, Merkos L'Inyonei Chinuch.

In 1990, Rabbi Schneerson selected Krinsky to serve as the official secretary of the movement's three central organizations, Agudas Chasidei Chabad, Merkos L'Inyonei Chinuch, and Machneh Israel, the movement's social services arm.

Today, Krinsky serves as Chairman of Merkos L'Inyonei Chinuch and Machne Israel, secretary of Agudas Chasidei Chabad, and director of the Kehot Publication Society.

Family
Krinsky married Devorah Kasinetz, daughter of Rabbi Zev and Ethel Kasinetz. Their children are:
Rabbi Levi Krinsky, director of Chabad of New Hampshire
Rabbi Hillel David Krinsky, who is married to Shterna Sarah Garelik, daughter of Rabbi Gershon Mendel Garelik, Chief Chabad Emissary of Milan, Italy. And is the founder of Jewish Educational Media.
Menachem Mendel Krinsky, who is married to Miriam Turner of Chicago
Rabbi Shmaya Krinsky, who is married to Rivkah Gutnick, daughter of Australian commodities magnate Joseph Gutnick
Sheine B. Krinsky, who is married to Rabbi Yosef B. Friedman, associate director of the Kehot Publication Society
Chana Krinsky, who is married to Rabbi Joseph Futerfas, director of Camp Gan Israel, New York

Recognition
Krinsky's achievements have been recognized in the press. He appeared in several lists of influential American Jews, including the Forward 50 in 2005.

From 2007 to 2013, Newsweek magazine compiled an annual list of the fifty most influential rabbis in the United States. Krinsky was nominated to the list each year. His placings varied from year to year, but he never dropped from the top five.
2007: 2nd place
2008: 4th place
2009: 4th place
2010: 1st place 
2011: 1st place
2012: 2nd place
2013: 4th place

References

Chabad-Lubavitch rabbis
American Hasidic rabbis
21st-century American rabbis
Living people
1933 births
Rabbis from Boston
20th-century American rabbis